The 1966 Scottish League Cup final was played on 29 October 1966 at Hampden Park in Glasgow and it was the final of the 21st Scottish League Cup competition. The final was contested by the Old Firm rivals Rangers and Celtic for a third consecutive year. Celtic won the match 1–0, with Bobby Lennox scoring the only goal.

This meant that Celtic completed the first leg of the Quadruple in 1966–67, as they won all three major Scottish domestic honours and the 1967 European Cup Final.

Match details

References

External links 

 Soccerbase

1966
League Cup Final
Scottish League Cup Final 1966
Scottish League Cup Final 1966
October 1966 sports events in the United Kingdom
1960s in Glasgow
Old Firm matches